The Lady Zhou's Memorial Gate is a paifang in Beitou District, Taipei, Taiwan.

Name
The gate is named after Lady Zhou, a local lady who was born in 1788 and died in 1846. She was widowed a very young age and raised her children as a single mother. She was known to be very filial to her parents-in-law.

History
The establishment of the gate was proposed in 1850 by Governor-General Liu of Zhejiang and Fujian to commemorate Lady Zhou's good deeds. The construction was then completed in 1861. The gate was partially damaged by an earthquake on 15 March 1897. The gate was eventually restored by the Department of Civil Affairs of Taipei City Government in 1992.

Architecture
The gate is made from stones of Mount Guanyin in New Taipei.

Transportation
The gate is accessible within walking distance north of Beitou Station of Taipei Metro.

See also
 List of tourist attractions in Taiwan

References

1861 establishments in Taiwan
Buildings and structures completed in 1861
Gates in Taipei